Bhuyanpur is an upazila of Tangail District in the Division of Dhaka, Bangladesh.

Geography
It has 32145 households and total area of 225.02 km2. The upazila is surrounded by Gopalpur & Sarishabari Upazila on the north, Kalihati Upazila on the south, Gopalpur and Ghatail Upazila on the east, and the Jamuna River on the west.

Demographics
At the 1991 census Bhuapur had a population of 177,095, of whom 87,854 were aged 18 or older. Males constituted 51.65% of the population, and females 48.35%. Bhuyanpur had an average literacy rate of 29.9% (7+ years), against the national average of 32.4%.

Administration
Bhuapur Upazila is divided into Bhuapur Municipality and six union parishads: Arjuna, Aloa, Falda, Gabsara, Gobindashi, and Nikrail. The union parishads are subdivided into 81 mauzas and 128 villages.

Bhuapur Municipality is subdivided into 9 wards and 22 mahallas.

See also 
 Bhuapur
 Upazilas of Bangladesh
 Districts of Bangladesh
 Divisions of Bangladesh

References 

 
Upazilas of Tangail District

ru:Бхуапур